John Nugent (fl. 1904) was an English-born footballer who played in the Football League for Notts County.

References

English footballers
Notts County F.C. players
English Football League players
Year of death missing
Year of birth missing
Association football goalkeepers